Nattayot Pol-yiam (born  April 17, 1997) is a Thai professional footballer who plays as a midfielder or full-back for Thai League 1 club Lampang.

References

External links
 

1997 births
Living people
Nattayot Pol-yiam
Association football midfielders
Nattayot Pol-yiam
Nattayot Pol-yiam
Nattayot Pol-yiam
Nattayot Pol-yiam
Nattayot Pol-yiam